Bagnols-sur-Cèze ("Bagnols-on-Cèze") is a commune in the Gard department in the Occitania region in Southern France. In 2019, it had a population of 18,091.

History
A small regional centre, Bagnols-sur-Cèze was quite certainly a Roman town (the name of the town comes from the Latin  meaning "related to baths, bathing-place") before the main part was built in the 13th century around a central arcaded square that is still preserved today. At the same period, the regional market was installed here, undoubtedly contributing to its expansion.

Demographics
Bagnols-sur-Ceze expanded steadily after the Marcoule nuclear centre was established in 1956.

Sights
The old center of Bagnols-sur-Cèze retains its historic feel, with small streets and largely preserved architecture. Several façades are remarkable. The towns contains a notable museum of contemporary art, the Musée Albert-André, founded in 1868 as well as an archaeological museum with a collection of artifacts found mainly in nearby Roman sites.
 
The shoegaze music band named Alcest is from this city.

There are several murals featuring optical illusions.

International relations

Bagnols-sur-Cèze is twinned with:
 Braunfels, Germany, since 1959
 Feltre, Italy, since 1961
 Newbury, England, since 1971
 Eeklo, Belgium, since 1976
 Carcaixent, Spain, since 1982
 Kiskunfélegyháza, Hungary

Notable people
Gersonides (born 1288), Jewish philosopher, Talmudist, mathematician, physician and astronomer/astrologer
Yann Hubert (born 1985), goalkeeper
Albéric Pont (1870-1960), dentist and pioneer in maxillofacial surgery
Lionel Pérez (born 1967), goalkeeper
Neige (born 1986), blackgaze musician

Albert André, art collector of late 19th century art, who bequeathed his magnificent collection to the town of Bagnols-sur-Cèze, where it resides in the Mairie, as the Musée Albert André

See also
 Communes of the Gard department
 List of works by Auguste Carli

References

External links

 Official website 
 Bagnols sur Cèze tourist office website
 Overview of Bagnols sur Cèze

Communes of Gard
Languedoc